Bolwarra is a suburb in the City of Maitland in the Hunter Region of New South Wales, Australia.

The traditional owners and custodians of the Maitland area are the Wonnarua people.

Name

Bolwarra was named by John Brown, a native word meaning 'a flash of light', in 1822. P22. (`Dawn in the Valley` by WA Woods).

References

Suburbs of Maitland, New South Wales